This article describes the knockout stage of the 2014–15 Women's EHF Champions League.

Qualified teams
The top four placed teams from each of the two main round groups advanced to the knockout stage.

Quarterfinals
The matches were played on 4–5 April and 11–12 April 2015.

Matches

|}

First leg

Second leg

Dinamo Volgograd won 53–50 on aggregate.

Vardar won 51–45 on aggregate.

Larvik HK won 65–44 on aggregate.

Budućnost won 57–41 on aggregate.

Final four
The draw was held on 14 April 2015.

Bracket

Semifinals

Third place game

Final

References

2014-15 knockout stage